In mathematics, the map segmentation problem is a kind of optimization problem. It involves a certain geographic region that has to be partitioned into smaller sub-regions in order to achieve a certain goal. Typical optimization objectives include:
 Minimizing the workload of a fleet of vehicles assigned to the sub-regions;
 Balancing the consumption of a resource, as in fair cake-cutting.
 Determining the optimal locations of supply depots;
 Maximizing the surveillance coverage.

Fair division of land has been an important issue since ancient times, e.g. in ancient Greece.

Notation 
There is a geographic region denoted by C ("cake").

A partition of C, denoted by X, is a list of disjoint subregions whose union is C:

There is a certain set of additional parameters (such as: obstacles, fixed points or probability density functions), denoted by P.

There is a real-valued function denoted by G ("goal") on the set of all partitions.

The map segmentation problem is to find:

where the minimization is on the set of all partitions of C.

Often, there are geometric shape constraints on the partitions, e.g., it may be required that each part be a convex set or a connected set or at least a measurable set.

Examples 
1. Red-blue partitioning: there is a set  of blue points and a set  of red points. Here:
 The cake C is the entire plane ;
 The parameters P are the two sets of points;
 The goal function G is
 
 It equals 0 if each region has exactly a fraction  of the points of each color.

Related problems 
 A Voronoi diagram is a specific type of map-segmentation problem.
 Fair cake-cutting, when the cake is two-dimensional, is another specific map-segmentation problem when the cake is two-dimensional, like in the Hill–Beck land division problem.
 The Stone–Tukey theorem is related to a specific map-segmentation problem.

References 

Fair division
Mathematical optimization